The 1987–88 Polska Liga Hokejowa season was the 53rd season of the Polska Liga Hokejowa, the top level of ice hockey in Poland. 10 teams participated in the league, and Polonia Bytom won the championship.

Final round

Qualification round

Playoffs

Quarterfinals 
 Polonia Bytom - Unia Oświęcim 2:0 (12:2, 7:2)
 Zagłębie Sosnowiec - Podhale Nowy Targ 2:0 (4:2, 4:3 n.P.)
 GKS Tychy - GKS Katowice 2:1 (4:0, 2:6, 6:1)
 Naprzód Janów - KS Cracovia 2:0 (4:3, 8:1)

Semifinals
 Polonia Bytom - Zagłębie Sosnowiec 2:1 (4:6, 5:2, 10:1)
 GKS Tychy - Naprzód Janów 2:1 (3:1, 5:6, 4:2)

Final 
 Polonia Bytom - GKS Tychy 2:0 (5:2, 4:0)

Placing round

7th place
 Stoczniowiec Gdansk - Unia Oświęcim 1:2 (7:6, 5:7, 1:4)

5th place 
 Podhale Nowy Targ - GKS Katowice 2:0 (9:2, 6:2)

3rd place 
 Naprzód Janów - Zagłębie Sosnowiec 1:2 (3:2, 2:5, 2:3)

Relegation 
 ŁKS Łódź - KS Cracovia 0:4 (1:6, 1:9, 1:7, 1:4)

External links
 Season on hockeyarchives.info

1987-88
Pol
Liga